is a Japanese director of anime.

Works
Strange Dawn (2000–2000)
You're Under Arrest Second Season (2001–2001)
Princess Tutu (2002–2003)
Fushigiboshi no Futagohime (2005–2006)
Fushigiboshi no Futagohime Gyu! (2006–2007)

References 

Anime directors
Living people
Year of birth missing (living people)